(stylised as ω-Force) is a Japanese video game developer and a division of Koei Tecmo, founded in 1996 by Akihiro Suzuki and Kenichi Ogasawara, and is best known for the Dynasty Warriors video games.

History 
Omega Force was founded in 1996 as the fourth Business Division of Koei, with the intention of widening the appeal of Koei's portfolio outside of their strategy and simulation games, such as Romance of Three Kingdoms and Nobunaga's Ambition. Kenichi Ogasawra origimally joined Koei in hopes of being able to work on Nobunaga's Ambition as a planner, of which he was fan of. However, due to his lack of programming skills, was assigned to a training course to become a programmer, and to porting games from NEC PC-9801 to the Super Nintendo. Ogasawara, after being promoted to planner, was then tasked by Koei to create a 3D action game utilising the, at the time, new technology capabilities of the PlayStation, resulting in the development of Dynasty Warriors and the establishment of Omega Force. 

The studio was originally going to be named after the letter Z, however this idea never came to fruition, as the letter Z can have different meanings outside of Japanese culture. Wanting to keep the last letter of the alphabet, they settled for Omega from the Greek alphabet. However, because of copyright concerns with the clock manufacturing company Omega SA, Force was added – a Japanese homophone for "fourth" – representing that they are the fourth business division. 

WinBack, released in 1999 for the Nintendo 64, pioneered the cover-based third-person shooter, inspiring games such as Kill Switch, Gears of War, and Metal Gear Solid 2: Sons of Liberty. It also featured an early rendition of the laser sight mechanic, which would later be seen in games such as Resident Evil 4. The cover system has since become a staple of the third-person shooter genre. With Winback, which was originally shown off at the at the 1999 Electronic Entertainment Expo and later at the 1999 Nintendo Spaceworld trade show, Omega Force was once again tasked by Koei to create a title it wasn't known for. 

In 2016, Kenichi Ogasawara mentioned in an interview with Famitsu, that the next entry in their key franchise Dynasty Warriors, dubbed Dynasty Warriors 9, was in the development. He hoped to have a greater impact with Dynasty Warriors 9, as he mentioned "the evolution from Dynasty Warriors 7 to 8 was insufficient". Producers Masaki Furusawa and Akihiro Suzuki planned to overhaul the franchise's often criticized combat system. In 2018, Omega Force released Dynasty Warriors 9, moving the franchise from its arena-based combat to an open-world.

Hyrule Warriors: Age of Calamity, the third collaboration project between Omega Force and Nintendo, released in 2020, became the best-selling Warriors game, as well as the developer's best-selling title, shipping over 4 million copies as January 2022.

In 2022, Omega Force announced a partnership with Electronic Arts, along with its parent company Koei Tecmo. Their new game, Wild Hearts, would be published under their EA Originals label. The game was officially announced on September 23, 2022. Wild Hearts director, Kotaro Hirata, mentioned that Dynasty Warriors has become a pillar franchise for Omega Force, and that with Wild Hearts, they wanted another strong pillar franchise for Omega Force, hoping to widen their audience, and create more internationally appealing titles. EA's Andrew Wilson mentioned in an investor meeting, that the success of Monster Hunter led to EA greenlighting the title.

 Games 

 Warriors games 
The Warriors series, known in Japan as the  series, is an action game series created by Omega Force and published by Koei Tecmo. The meta-series contains various series, such as the Dynasty Warriors games, the One Piece: Pirate Warriors games, and various spin-offs.

In Japanese, all games after Dynasty Warriors 2 carry the  title, but English localizations continue to use Dynasty Warriors, putting all international releases a number ahead of their Japanese counterparts.

 Main series 

 Spin-offs 

It is a crossover of Dynasty Warriors and Samurai Warriors''.

Licensed Warriors Games

Other

References

External links 

 
 
  

Japanese companies established in 1996
Koei Tecmo
Video game companies of Japan
Video game development companies
Video game companies established in 1996